Certified Accountant  may refer to:

Certified Public Accountant, a statutory title of qualified accountants in several countries
Chartered Accountant, an Indian certified professional position created through Chartered Accountants Act 1949
Certified General Accountant, a Canadian qualified accountant designation
Certified Management Accountant, a qualified accountant designation in U.S. and Canada
Certified National Accountant, a Nigerian qualified accountant designation
Certified Practising Accountant, a title used by members of CPA Australia
Chartered Certified Accountant or Certified Accountant, a British designation

See also
 Chartered accountant
 Chartered Professional Accountant